Hospitality Management and Tourism is the study of the hospitality industry. A degree in the subject may be awarded either by a university college dedicated to the studies of hospitality management or a business school with a relevant department. Degrees in hospitality management may also be referred to as hotel management, hotel and tourism management, or hotel administration. Degrees conferred in this academic field include BA, Bachelor of Business Administration, BS, BASc, B.Voc, MS, MBA, Master of Management, PhD and short term course. Hospitality management covers hotels, restaurants, cruise ships, amusement parks, destination marketing organizations, convention centers, country clubs and many more.

Curriculum
In the US, hospitality and tourism management curricula follow similar core subject applications to that of a business degree, but with a focus on tourism development and hospitality management. Core subject areas include accounting, administration, entrepreneurship, finance, information systems, marketing, human resource management, public relations, strategy, quantitative methods, and sectoral studies in the various areas of hospitality business. Some programs in India also include culinary training.

Rankings of degree-granting programs
Many schools have departments that specifically give degrees in the hospitality field.

Rankings of hospitality schools by subject
The QS World University Rankings by Subject are based upon academic reputation, employer reputation and research impact. These results are reviewed and evaluated every year by academics and industry professionals to ensure consistent quality over time.
In 2022, the results were as follows:
 École hôtelière de Lausanne, - Lausanne, Switzerland
 University of Nevada, Las Vegas - Las Vegas, United States 
 Swiss Hotel Management School - Montreux, Switzerland
 Glion Institute of Higher Education - Glion, Switzerland
 Les Roches International School of Hotel Management - Switzerland
 Cesar Ritz Colleges - Le Bouveret, Switzerland
 Hotel Institute Montreux - Montreux, Switzerland
 Culinary Arts Academy Switzerland - Le Bouveret, Switzerland
 Hong Kong Polytechnic University - Hung Hom, Hong Kong

Publication surveys in hospitality-related academia
The Journal of Hospitality and Tourism Research completed an analysis of the top ten hospitality and tourism programs in the world. The results appeared as follows:
 Hong Kong Polytechnic University, Hong Kong SAR
 Cornell University, United States
 Michigan State University, United States
 University of Nevada, Las Vegas, United States
 Pennsylvania State University, United States
 University of Surrey, United Kingdom
 Virginia Tech, United States
 Purdue University, United States
 Oklahoma State University System, United States
 University of Central Florida, United States

See also

 American Hotel & Lodging Educational Institute
 Confederation of Tourism and Hospitality
 Kyiv National University of Trade and Economics
 Hotel manager
 Meetings, Incentives, Conferencing, Exhibitions
 List of hospitality management schools in Switzerland

References

Education by subject